Gerhardt Csejka (born 11 April 1945, in Zăbrani) is a German essayist and literary translator.

He has delivered lectures at the Johann Wolfgang Goethe-Universität Frankfurt am Main (1990-1992) and the Johannes Gutenberg-Universität Mainz (1993-2003).

He has been granted several important prizes.

References

External links
 
 eine Sammlung der Artikel von Gerhardt Csejka aus der „Neuen Literatur“
 Bibliografie als Übersetzer und mehr Details beim Europäischen Übersetzerkollegium
 40 Jahre Aktionsgruppe Banat, in: Halbjahresschrift - hjs-online, 2. April 2012

1945 births
People from Arad County
Academic staff of Goethe University Frankfurt
Academic staff of Johannes Gutenberg University Mainz
German essayists
German translators
Translators from Romanian
Translators to German
Living people
German male essayists